Yucay District is one of seven districts of the province Urubamba in Peru.

See also 
 Ayawayq'u
 Ch'akiqucha
 T'uqu T'uquyuq

References